"Champagne" is a song by American hip-hop group Salt-n-Pepa, taken from the soundtrack to the 1996 movie Bulletproof, starring Damon Wayans and Adam Sandler. The song contains elements of "Love Rollercoaster" (J. Williams, C. Satchell, L. Bonner, M. Jones, R. Middlebrooks, M. Pierce, W. Beck) as performed by The Ohio Players. It reached the top 10 in the Netherlands, and was a top 20 hit in Finland, New Zealand and Sweden, while entering the top 30 in the UK.

Critical reception
Larry Flick from Billboard wrote, "Riding a hypnotic guitar lick from "Love Rollercoaster" by the Ohio Players, the enduring divas of rap return with what they do best—a lip-smacking invitation to party. The track's hook never escapes the brain, and it is strengthened by the pair's flair for cute and clever rhymes." He added that "this will keep the kids bouncing well into the fall, while stirring anticipation for the act's long-promised MCA debut disc." A reviewer from Music Week rated the song three out of five, adding, "Unmistakably Salt 'N' Pepa, this lively hip hop affair is spruced up by a Seventies-style dance groove and a funky electronic voice last heard on Tupac's California Love."

Track listing
 CD single
 "Champagne" (Johnny Douglas Radio Mix) – 3:46
 "Champagne" (Album Version) – 3:19
 "Champagne" (Johnny Douglas 12" Mix) – 7:02
 "Champagne" (U.S. Remix) – 3:19

Charts

References

1996 singles
Salt-N-Pepa songs
1996 songs
MCA Records singles